Black-and-white fairywren may refer to:

 White-shouldered fairywren, a species of bird found in New Guinea
 Two subspecies of the white-winged fairywren, found in Australia

Birds by common name